The Journal of Diagnostic Medical Sonography (JDMS) is the bimonthly, peer-reviewed medical journal of the Society of Diagnostic Medical Sonography and publishes peer-reviewed manuscripts aimed at the translational use of ultrasound for diagnosis, intervention, and other clinical applications. The JDMS provides research, clinical and educational content for all specialties including but not limited to abdominal, women’s health, pediatric, cardiovascular, and musculoskeletal sonography. The Journal’s scope may also include research on instrumentation, physics, ergonomics, technical advancements, education, and professional issues in the field of ultrasonography. Types of submissions accepted by the JDMS are Original Research, Literature Review, Case Studies, Symposia (related to education, policy, technology or professional issues), and Letters to the Editor. 

The JDMS has been in publication since 1985 and is currently published by SAGE Publications in association with the Society of Diagnostic Medical Sonography.

Information on advertising opportunities, author resources, and current editorial board listing is available at https://www.sdms.org/membership/JDMS.

Abstracting and indexing 
The Journal of Diagnostic Medical Sonography is abstracted and indexed in:

 CINAHL
 Clarivate Analytics: Emerging Sources Citation Index (ESCI)
 EMBASE/Excerpta Medica
 InfoTrac (full text)
 Scopus

External links 
 

SAGE Publishing academic journals
English-language journals
Medical ultrasonography
Radiology and medical imaging journals
Bimonthly journals
Publications established in 1985